Gilbert Emerson Smith (September 22, 1903 – January 1, 1980) was an American football, basketball, and baseball coach at Defiance College in Defiance, Ohio.

References

1903 births
1980 deaths
Basketball coaches from Ohio
Defiance Yellow Jackets athletic directors
Defiance Yellow Jackets baseball coaches
Defiance Yellow Jackets football coaches
Defiance Yellow Jackets men's basketball coaches
Defiance Yellow Jackets football players
People from Defiance, Ohio